Groton is a town in northwestern Middlesex County, Massachusetts, United States, within the Greater Boston metropolitan area. The population was 11,315 at the 2020 census. It is home to two prep schools: Lawrence Academy at Groton, founded in 1792 and the third-oldest private school in Massachusetts; and Groton School, founded in 1884.

The town was a battlefield in King Philip's War and Queen Anne's War, as England and France competed through their North American colonies from the 17th century well into the 18th century. It was the birthplace of William Prescott, who commanded the colonial forces at the Battle of Bunker Hill during the American Revolution. In postwar years, it had incidents of insurrection during Shays' Rebellion (1786–1787).

History

The area surrounding modern-day Groton has, for thousands of years, been the territory of various cultures of indigenous peoples. They settled along the rivers, which they used for domestic tasks, fishing and transportation. Historic tribes were the Algonquian-speaking Nipmuc and Nashaway Indians.

The Anglo-American Groton started with the trading post of John Tinker, who conducted business there with the Nashaway at the confluence of Nod Brook and the Nashua River. The Nashaway called the area Petapawag, meaning "swampy land." As Tinker had, other pioneers followed the Algonquian trails from Massachusetts Bay. They found the region productive for fishing and farming.

The town was officially settled and incorporated in 1655, named for Groton in Suffolk, England.  Called The Plantation of Groton, it included all of present-day Groton and Ayer, almost all of Pepperell and Shirley, large parts of Dunstable, Littleton, and Tyngsborough, plus smaller parts of Harvard and Westford in Massachusetts, as well as Nashua and Hollis, New Hampshire.

During King Philip's War, when English colonists and Native Americans tried to destroy each other, on March 13, 1676, Native Americans raided and burned all buildings except for four Groton garrisons.  Among those killed was John Nutting, a Selectman at Groton.  Survivors fled to Concord and other safe havens. Two years later, many returned to rebuild.

Abenaki warriors attacked the town again during the Raid on Groton in 1694 (during King William's War). Lydia Longley and two of her siblings were taken captive; the rest of their family was killed. Lydia was taken to Montreal where she was ransomed, converted to Catholicism, and joined the Congregation of Notre Dame, a non-cloistered order.

In June 1707 during the years of Queen Anne's War, a French-Abenaki raid captured three children of the large family of Thomas Tarbell and his wife Elizabeth (Wood), cousins to the Longleys. The raiders took them overland and by water to the Mohawk mission village of Kahnawake (also spelled Caughnawaga) south of Montreal. There they could be held for ransom or adopted into the tribe by individual Mohawk families. The trade in captives was carried on for years given the continued warfare between the English and French in Europe and North America.

The two Tarbell boys, John and Zachariah, were adopted by Mohawk families and became fully assimilated. They later each married chiefs' daughters, had families, and became respected chiefs themselves. They were among the founders in the 1750s of Akwesasne, after moving up the St. Lawrence River from Kahnawake to escape the ill effects of traders. The brothers' older sister Sarah Tarbell was ransomed by a French family, and converted to Catholicism. Renamed as Marguerite, she followed Lydia Longley in joining  the Congregation of Notre Dame, and served with them for the rest of her life. In the late nineteenth century, a plaque was installed about the Tarbell children at the site of the family's former farm in Groton. Descendants with the Tarbell surname are among the Mohawk living at Kahnewake and Akwesasne in the 21st century.

In 1775, the common in front of the First Parish Church was an assembly area for Minutemen who fought in the Battle of Lexington and Concord.

19th century to present
In the 19th century and early part of the 20th century, Groton was a largely white and Christian town and may have been a sundown town. The town became a center of Ku Klux Klan activities after World War I; this second Klan expressed primarily anti-Catholic and anti-immigrant prejudice, while opposing ethnic minorities. In September 1924, Klansmen gathered in the town, arriving in approximately fifty automobiles, with identity-protected professionals and merchants from the area. Many townspeople opposed the Klan, and their active protest resulted in some violence. In October 1926, a group of 400 Klansmen were meeting in a field in the town when they were fired upon with guns used by a group of approximately 100 people opposed to the Klan. The police reported that over 100 gunshots were exchanged between the two groups, but no casualties were reported.

In 2017, following the negativity of the campaign for the 2016 presidential election, the town adopted the motto "All Are Welcome" as a statement of its openness and tolerance. Six stones were engraved with this motto and placed on the major roads entering the town from neighboring communities In 2020, nearly 100 years after the Klan events of the mid-1920s and in recognition of earlier violence and the contemporary social justice movement, Groton unanimously approved a measure denouncing racial bigotry and advocating equality.

Geography
According to the United States Census Bureau, Groton has a total area of 33.7 square miles (87.3 km2), of which 32.8 square miles (84.9 km2) is land and 0.9 square miles (2.4 km2) (2.79%) is water. Groton is the largest town in Middlesex County in terms of square mileage. The town is drained by the Nashua River, Squannacook River, and Merrimack River. The center of the town is dominated mainly by Gibbet Hill, with several other large hills throughout the town.

Groton is served by state routes 40, 111, 119 and 225. It borders the towns of Pepperell, Dunstable, Tyngsborough, Westford, Littleton, Ayer, Shirley, and Townsend.

Groton has a hot-summer humid continental climate (Dfa) bordering on Dfb and monthly averages range from 23.8 °F in January to 71.8 °F in July. The hardiness zone is 5b.

Climate
In a typical year, Groton, Massachusetts temperatures fall below 50F° for 195 days per year. Annual precipitation is typically 45.7 inches per year (high in the US) and snow covers the ground 68 days per year or 18.6% of the year (high in the US). It may be helpful to understand the yearly precipitation by imagining 9 straight days of moderate rain per year. The humidity is below 60% for approximately 25.4 days or 7% of the year.

Demographics

As of the census of 2000, there were 9,547 people, 3,268 households, and 2,568 families residing in the town. The racial makeup of the town was 97.22% White, 0.35% Black or African American, 0.13% Native American, 0.97% Asian, 0.02% Pacific Islander, 0.27% from other races, and 1.04% from two or more races. Hispanic or Latino of any race were 1.14% of the population.

There were 3,268 households, out of which 46.8% had children under the age of 18 living with them, 70.0% were married couples living together, 6.3% had a female householder with no husband present, and 21.4% were non-families. Of all households 17.1% were made up of individuals, and 5.4% had someone living alone who was 65 years of age or older. The average household size was 2.90 and the average family size was 3.31.

The age distribution of the town's population was 32.6% under the age of 18, 4.2% from 18 to 24, 32.7% from 25 to 44, 23.5% from 45 to 64, and 7.0% who were 65 years of age or older. The median age was 36 years. For every 100 females, there were 98.2 males. For every 100 females age 18 and over, there were 94.5 males.

The median income for a household in the town was $118,041, and the median income for a family was $136,653. Males had a median income of $101,117 versus $60,402 for females. The per capita income for the town was $44,756. About 1.1% of families and 1.8% of the population were below the poverty line, including 1.0% of those under age 18 and none of those age 65 or over.

Sports
Groton annually hosts the National Shepley Hill Horse Trials, an equestrian competition. The Groton-Dunstable Crusaders high school boys and girls athletic teams also compete in the town.

Government
The town is governed by an open town meeting and administered by an elected five-member select board and appointed town manager.

Education

Public schools

District schools

 Boutwell School
 Florence Roche Elementary School
 Groton-Dunstable Regional Middle School
 Groton-Dunstable Regional High School
 Prescott Elementary School (closed after the 2007–2008 school year due to budget cuts)

Other public schools
 Nashoba Valley Technical High School, Public Regional Vocational Technical High School located in Westford

Private schools

 Groton Community School
 Country Day School of the Holy Union (Founded 1949 – closed 2017)
 Lawrence Academy (Founded 1793 as Groton Academy)
 Groton School (Founded 1884)
 Lowthorpe School of Landscape Architecture (Founded 1901, merged with Rhode Island School of Design in 1945)

Points of interest

 Groton Historical Society & Museum
 Gibbet Hill Castle
 Kalliroscope Gallery
 Autumn Hills Orchard
 Grotonwood Camp and Conference Center
 The Old Groton Inn
 Groton Public Library
 Groton School
 Lawrence Academy

Buildings and structures
 Gov. George S. Boutwell House
 Indian Hill House
 Groton Inn, burned down on the night of August 2, 2011, rebuilding was completed in 2018 with the reopening in May.

Conservation land
Over 30% of the land in Groton, Massachusetts is protected open space. The majority of this open space is accessible to the public. Groton also has over 100 miles of trails. Many of these trails can be walked and biked, others are availably for hunting and/or camping. The trails are made and maintained by the Groton Trail Committee and the land itself is owned and managed by the Groton Conservation Trust, The Groton Conservation Commission, the Massachusetts Audubon Society,  The New England Forestry Foundation, The Massachusetts Department of Conservation & Recreation, and The Massachusetts Department of Fish and Game.

Notable people
 Andy Anderson, US National Team and Groton School Rowing Coach and member of the National Rowing Hall of Fame
 Charles William Bardeen, educator and publisher
 John P. Bigelow, mayor of Boston
 Timothy Bigelow, lawyer, and father of John
 George Sewall Boutwell, governor and statesman
 Bill Camp, actor
 Samuel Dana, clergyman
 Samuel Dana, congressman
 Margaret Fuller, journalist, critic and women's rights activist
 Timothy Fuller, U.S. Congressman, and father of Margaret
 Peter Gammons, sports writer and analyst
 J. Geils, founder of The J. Geils Band
 Kristen Gilbert, serial killer
 Samuel Abbott Green, physician and mayor of Boston
 Kevin Kastning, musician, composer and musical instrument inventor
 Elizabeth Knapp, the Witch of Groton
 Steve Kornacki, political writer and TV host
 Abbott Lawrence, businessman, founder of Lawrence
 Amos Lawrence, merchant and philanthropist
 Amos Adams Lawrence, abolitionist and college founder
 Samuel Lawrence, revolutionary and school founder
 Barzillai Lew, soldier, fifer and drummer
 Lydia Longley, "The First American Nun"
 Paul Matisse, artist and inventor
 Shabazz Napier, basketball player
 Shelley Olds, professional cyclist who represented the United States in the 2012 Summer Olympics
 Edward Saxton Payson, Esperantist, writer and translator
 Otto Piene, German artist
 Oliver Prescott, Massachusetts general, physician and judge
 William Prescott, revolutionary soldier
 William M. Richardson, U.S. Congressman
 Job Shattuck, soldier, Shays' Rebellion agitator
 Dan Shaughnessy, Boston sports columnist
 Ether Shepley, US Senator from Maine
 Lucius Edwin Smith, pastor of the Baptist church in Groton 1858–1865
 Charles Warren Stone, US Congressman
 Edmund C. Tarbell, artist, American Impressionist
 Frank Bigelow Tarbell, professor and author
 Samuel Willard, colonial minister
 Simon Willard, colonist, father of Samuel

References

Further reading
 Samuel Abbott Green, Historical Sketch of Groton, Massachusetts. 1655–1890, Groton: 1894
 Wall & Gray, 1871 Atlas of Massachusetts,  Map of Massachusetts. Map of Middlesex County
 Samuel Adams Drake, History of Middlesex County, Massachusetts, Vol. 2 (L–W), 1879–1880, pp. 505 and 572
 Samuel A. Green, "Groton", in Samuel Adams Drake, History of Middlesex County, Massachusetts, Vol. 1, pp. 454–469.

External links

 Town of Groton official website
 Groton Public Library
 

 
1655 establishments in Massachusetts
Sundown towns in the United States
Towns in Massachusetts
Towns in Middlesex County, Massachusetts